Matthew Elliot Jones (born December 5, 1994) is an American professional basketball player for the Bank of Taiwan of the Super Basketball League (SBL). He played four seasons of college basketball for Duke University.

High school career
During Jones's career at DeSoto High School, the team had a 131–18 record, and he was named All-State, 2nd team All-American from MaxPreps, and played in both the Jordan Classic and the McDonald's All-American Game. On November 28, 2011, Jones committed to Duke University.

College career
Jones was on Duke's 2014–15 NCAA Championship team. After Rasheed Sulaimon was dismissed, Jones was moved into the starting lineup. “I’ve definitely tried to grasp it and take ahold of it,” Jones said.. “Obviously we didn’t want Rasheed to leave, but at the same time, personally, I was ecstatic about it. I just told myself that it was my moment now, and I had to just take advantage of it.”

In the Elite Eight, he scored 16 points, going 4-for-7 on three-pointers in a win against Gonzaga. As a result, he was named to the South Region all-tournament team. The all-regional performance came at NRG Stadium in Houston, just over 3 hours away from Jones' home in DeSoto, Texas.

Professional career
After going undrafted, Jones joined the Reno Bighorns of the NBA G League. He remained on the team as it became the Stockton Kings.

Personal life
He has two sisters and a brother, Mason, who was a player at the University of Arkansas, and now is a player for the Los Angeles Lakers on a two-way contract. One sister, Jordan, also played in the McDonald's high school basketball game—they are the 3rd brother/sister duo to play in that all star game.

References

1994 births
Living people
American men's basketball players
Basketball players from Texas
Duke Blue Devils men's basketball players
McDonald's High School All-Americans
People from DeSoto, Texas
Reno Bighorns players
Shooting guards
Sportspeople from the Dallas–Fort Worth metroplex
Stockton Kings players
American expatriate basketball people in Taiwan
Bank of Taiwan basketball players
Super Basketball League imports